Alex Coles (born 21 September 1999) is an English professional rugby union player who plays as a Lock for Premiership Rugby club Northampton Saints.

Playing career

Club
Coles played rugby as a child at Newmarket and Shelford Rugby Club prior to joining the academy of Northampton Saints at the age of fourteen. In November 2018 he made his club debut for Northampton in a Premiership Rugby Cup match against Wasps and the following year scored his first try for the club against Timișoara in the EPCR Challenge Cup.

International
In 2017 Coles played for the England under-18 team on their tour of South Africa. He represented the England under-20 team in the 2019 Six Nations Under 20s Championship and was a member of the squad that finished fifth at the 2019 World Rugby Under 20 Championship. On 6th November 2022, Coles made his debut for England in a 29-30 loss to Argentina in the Autumn Nations Series.

References

External links
Northampton Saints Profile
ESPN Profile
Ultimate Rugby Profile

1999 births
Living people
English rugby union players
Northampton Saints players
Rugby union locks
Rugby union players from Cambridge
Alumni of Birkbeck, University of London
People educated at The Perse School
England international rugby union players